Government College of Engineering, Karad (GCEK) is an autonomous technical institute in the Indian state of Maharashtra. It was established in 1960 and is affiliated to the Shivaji University with an autonomous status under the UGC. The autonomy was granted by the UGC. Karad is a culturally vibrant town and is a sought after center of education in Western Maharashtra.

The students and alumni of Government College of Engineering, Karad are colloquially referred to as GCOEKians.

Over the years the college has produced about 10140 engineers and more than 700 computer professionals through a Master of Computer Application course in the Engineering faculty.

Government College of Engineering, Karad is located in Vidyanagar, Karad besides Saidapur.

History 

Government College of Engineering, Karad is one among seven engineering colleges established by the State Government of Maharashtra and first among those established post-independence. The prime objective of establishing the college was to impart technical education to the youth in rural parts of Maharashtra. Basically three institutes i.e. Engineering College, Government Polytechnic and Pharmacy College started functioning in the same premises. Other colleges were then shifted to their independent premises and the heritage building was retained by the college.
The college was established in 1960 with undergraduate programmes in three core branches of Civil, Mechanical and Electrical Engineering, initially affiliated to Savitribai Phule Pune University and subsequently to Shivaji University in 1972. Post graduate programmes (Master of Engineering) in these disciplines too were started in 1967.

The UG programs in Civil, Mechanical and Electrical are ‘permanently affiliated’ to Shivaji University. In response to the drive of globalization and industry needs, the institute started MCA (Master of Computer Applications) course in 1992. This was the only engineering institute in Maharashtra to offer the MCA course in engineering discipline.

Subsequently, in 1995 all disciplines of the institute were approved by AICTE (AICTE established in 1994). With the boom in Information Technology, Directorate of Technical Education, Maharashtra (DTE) shouldered the responsibility of starting the bachelor's degree course in IT to cater to the need of meritorious students in this region and the new branch of engineering in Information Technology was started in the institute from 2001. In due course of time, the institute has also started an undergraduate programme in Electronics and Telecommunications in 2007.

Currently, GCEK offers five UG and eight PG programmes.

Departments 
 Electrical Engineering Department
 Civil Engineering Department
 Mechanical Engineering Department
 Information Technology Department
 Electronics and Telecommunication Engineering Department
 MCA Department
 Applied Mechanics Department
 Mathematics Department
 Physics Department
 Chemistry Department

Academics

Admissions

Undergraduate 
The admissions to the college are governed by the Directorate of Technical Education (DTE). The DTE previously hold the all Maharashtra State level MH-CET (Maharashtra Common Entrance Test), which was a compulsory examination to admission in engineering (from 2005 to 2013). From 2014 onwards, The Score of All India JEE Main (Paper 1) and HSC Marks shall be considered for preparing the merit and admission purpose (as per the Maharashtra Government Resolution Dt. 31 Oct 2012). Now the score of MHT-CET is necessary to get admission into the Government Colleges in Maharashtra, while the score of JEE Mains Paper-1 is only applicable for private Engineering Institutes.

The ratio of girls students to boys students is  34:66. Being a government institute, all seats are strictly filled as per government norms.

Post-graduate 
In 2013, Admissions are given on the basis of both GATE 2013 and DTE-held PGET-CET 2013 basis. From 2014 onwards, all the admissions will be given on the basis of GATE score.

Academic programmes 

Government College of Engineering Karad offers 5 undergraduate and 6 post graduate programmes. Details are:
 Master of Technology (M.Tech)
 Construction Management – Started in 2005
 Structural Engineering – Started in 1967
 Electrical Power System – Started in 2005
 Heat Power Engineering – Started in 2005
 Production Engineering – Started in 1967
 Design Engineering – Started in 2019
 Computer Science and Engineering – Started in 2019
 Master in Computer Application (M.C.A.) – Started in 1992
 Bachelor of Technology (B.Tech)
 Civil Engineering – Started in 1960
 Information Technology – Started in 2001
 Electrical Engineering – Started in 1960
 Electronics and Telecommunication Engineering – Started in 2007
 Mechanical Engineering – Started in 1960

Campus 

The campus is situated in Vidyanagar, Karad. GCEK has a green campus of about 40 acres(161874 m2). All departments & laboratories are housed on the campus. Residential accommodation for teaching & non-teaching staff of the college are available on the campus. Consciously developed, the campus has retained & increased its green cover, rich in natural flora & fauna, & provides an attraction for bird watchers.

The college provides residential facilities for both undergraduate boys and girls. Due to limited vacancies, admissions are merit-based. There are three residential buildings in the hostel campus. Boys' blocks are named B, C, D. The total capacity of boys hostels is 480. For girls, there is one block, namely, Jijau. This was constructed keeping in mind, the huge number of the college's girl-students staying outside. Its capacity is 240. Jijau is four storied, and the remaining buildings are three storied. For PG there's a hostel for boys with capacity of 45.

Further it comprises the principal's residence, hostel office, security room, rectors' quarters, a co-operative store, students' dining rooms. The institute also has a well-equipped gym for students. The Gymkhana consists of Gymkhana Secretary along with secretaries of various sports and cultural committees. The institute has a large ground for sports activities including cricket, football, volleyball, kabbadi, kho-kho.

Library 

The Central library is equipped with the library software with barcode system (OPAC). It has around 28279 titles of text/reference books with a volume of 65583 in the relevant disciplines of engineering. It also has around 80 top national and international scientific journal. Students can also avail the book bank facility. Every department has its own departmental library, maintained by students through their respective associations.

Student life

Events 

The flagship event "Aavishkar" is a national level techno-managerial event, which showcases the  technical and managerial skills of the students held every year. This event is entirely managed by students for the students.

See also 
Other Government Engineering Colleges (GEC's) in Maharashtra
 College of Engineering, Pune
 Government College of Engineering, Amravati
 Government College of Engineering, Aurangabad
 Government College of Engineering, Chandrapur
 Government College of Engineering, Jalgaon
 Government College Of Engineering And Research, Avasari Khurd
 Shri Guru Gobind Singhji Institute of Engineering and Technology, Nanded
 Veermata Jijabai Technological Institute, Mumbai

References

External links 
 

Other Engineering Colleges in Maharashtra
Shivaji University
All India Council for Technical Education
Education in Satara district
Educational institutions established in 1960
1960 establishments in Maharashtra
Karad